The palate is the roof of the mouth in humans and other mammals. It separates the oral cavity from the nasal cavity. A similar structure is found in crocodilians, but in most other tetrapods, the oral and nasal cavities are not truly separated. The palate is divided into two parts, the anterior, bony hard palate and the posterior, fleshy soft palate (or velum).

Structure

Innervation
The maxillary nerve branch of the trigeminal nerve supplies sensory innervation to the palate.

Development
The hard palate forms before birth.

Variation

If the fusion is incomplete,  a cleft palate results.

Function
When functioning in conjunction with other parts of the mouth, the palate produces certain sounds, particularly velar, palatal, palatalized, postalveolar, alveolopalatal, and uvular consonants.

History

Etymology
The English synonyms palate and palatum, and also the related adjective palatine (as in palatine bone), are all from the Latin palatum via Old French palat, words that like their English derivatives, refer to the "roof" of the mouth.

The Latin word palatum is of unknown (possibly Etruscan) ultimate origin and served also as a source to the Latin word meaning palace, palatium, from which other senses of palatine and the English word palace derive, and not the other way round.

As the roof of the mouth was once considered the seat of the sense of taste, palate can also refer to this sense itself, as in the phrase "a discriminating palate". By further extension, the flavor of a food (particularly beer or wine) may be called its palate, as when a wine is said to have an oaky palate.

See also

Language
Vocal tract
Pallet, palette and pellet, objects whose names are homophonous with palate for many English-speakers
Palatability

Bibliography

References